Austin Powers may refer to: 

 Austin Powers, all films in the Austin Powers series:
 Austin Powers: International Man of Mystery, the first Austin Powers film, 1997
 Austin Powers: The Spy Who Shagged Me, the second Austin Powers film, 1999
 Austin Powers in Goldmember, the third Austin Powers film, 2002
 Austin Powers (character), the eponymous main character of the film series
 Austin Powers: Welcome to My Underground Lair!, a 2000 video game based on the Austin Powers series
 Austin Powers Pinball, a 2002 video game based on the Austin Powers series
 Austin Powers Collectible Card Game, collectible card game based on the Austin Powers Series

See also
 List of Austin Powers characters